Grahan is an Indian Marathi language horror series which aired on Zee Marathi by replacing Gaav Gata Gajali. It starred Pallavi Joshi in lead role.

Cast 
 Pallavi Joshi as Rama / Vasudha
 Yogesh Deshpande as Niranjan
 Sunil Barve as Abhay Potdar
 Varsha Ghatpande
 Ved Ambre
 Neeraj Goswami
 Manjiri Pupala
 Sharvani Pillai
 Abhijeet Chavan
 Ananda Karekar
 Pandharinath Kamble
 Jaywant Wadkar

Reception

Special episode (1 hour) 
 15 April 2018

References

External links 
 
 Grahan at ZEE5

Marathi-language television shows
2018 Indian television series debuts
Zee Marathi original programming
2018 Indian television series endings